= VLOC =

VLOC may refer to:

In transportation:

- Very large ore carrier
- VOR/Localizer, used in aviation navigation; for VOR, see VHF Omni-directional Radio Range
